Thomas G. Ambrosino is an American politician and government official who served as Mayor of Revere, Massachusetts from 2000 to 2012 and is currently the City Manager of Chelsea, Massachusetts.

Early life
Ambrosino was born on November 21, 1961, to Frederick and Margaret Ambrosino. His father was a lieutenant with the Revere Police Department and his mother was a kitchen aide at a local nursing home. Ambrosino graduated from Revere High School in 1979. He went on to pursue a bachelor's degree in political science from Boston University in 1983 and a Juris Doctor degree from Harvard Law School in 1986. After passing the bar, Ambrosino spent fourteen years as a practicing attorney. From 1986 to 1994, he was an associate at the Boston firm of Palmer & Dodge. He then ran his independent practice in Revere until he became mayor.

Politics
From 1990 to 1996, Ambrosino was a member of the Revere School Committee. He then served on the Revere City Council from 1996 to 2000.

Mayor of Revere
In 1999, Ambrosino ran for Mayor of Revere against four-term incumbent Robert J. Haas, Jr. He ran on a platform of limiting taxes and improving education while refraining from sharply criticizing Haas. On November 2, Ambrosino defeated Hass with  7,742 votes to 4,238. John Laidler of The Boston Globe described Ambrosino's 3,504-vote margin of victory as "stunning" and stated that "voters overwhelmingly embraced Ambrosino despite ample evidence that Revere is on the upswing under its current mayor".

Ambrosino made economic development one of his top priorities. During his tenure as Mayor, Saunders Hotel Group, Hampton Inn, and Marriott Residence Inn, all opened new hotels in Revere, Necco constructed a new headquarters in the city, a retail development was built at Suffolk Downs, several small commercial properties were constructed, and plans were announced for a mixed-use project on beachfront land adjacent to the Wonderland MBTA station.

Also during Ambrosino's tenure, Revere made a number of infrastructure improvements, including the construction of four new schools.

In 2011, Ambrosino chose not to run for reelection, as he felt he had accomplished almost all of the things he had set out to do when he first took office and was feeling a bit worn down by the job.

Executive director of the Supreme Judicial Court
In the fall of 2011, Ambrosino applied for the position of executive director of the Massachusetts Supreme Judicial Court. He was selected out of a pool of over 100 applicants. His hiring was announced on January 4, 2012, two days after leaving office. As executive director of the Supreme Judicial Court, Ambrosino oversaw the day-to-day administration of the Supreme Judicial Court as well as assisting the chief justice for administration and management of the trial court and the court administrator in the overall operation of the trial courts. He received an annual salary of $129,000.

Chelsea city manager
In 2015, Ambrosino and former Portland, Maine city manager Mark Rees were finalists to succeed Jay Ash as city manager of Chelsea, Massachusetts. On June 8, 2015, the Chelsea city council voted 8 to 3 to hire Ambrosino. He negotiated a four-year contract with the council and took office on July 20, 2015.

References

1961 births
Boston University College of Arts and Sciences alumni
Harvard Law School alumni
Massachusetts city council members
Massachusetts city managers
Massachusetts lawyers
Mayors of Revere, Massachusetts
Living people
Revere High School (Massachusetts) alumni